Under Wraps may refer to:

 Under Wraps (Shaun Cassidy album), 1978
 Under Wraps (Jethro Tull album), 1984
 Under Wraps (1997 film), a Disney Channel Original Movie
 Under Wraps (2021 film), a Disney Channel Original Movie, a remake of the 1997 film
 "Under Wraps" (Ben 10 episode), an episode of Ben 10
 "Under Wraps", 2018 song by Her's
 "Under Wraps", 2014 song by Ghost Town off the album The After Party